The following is a list of flags related with Mauritania.

National flags

Government flags

Ethnic Group Flag

Historical flags

Under Moroccan Rule

Mali Empire

Under Portuguese Rule

Under Dutch Rule

Under German Rule

Under French Rule

See also 

 Flag of Mauritania
 Seal of Mauritania

References 

Lists and galleries of flags
Flags